The Mudrika Seva (Ring Road bus service) is one of the most popular bus routes in Delhi, India.  Started by the Delhi Transport Corporation (DTC), it is now operated by both the DTC and private operators.

Mudrika Seva is based on the Delhi ring road with major stops at AIIMS, Lajpat Nagar, Sarai Kale Khan, ITO, Delhi Gate, Kashmiri Gate, Delhi University North Campus, Model Town, Azadpur Market, Shalimar Bagh, Punjabi Bagh, Britannia Factory, Rajouri Garden, Naraina, and Delhi University South Campus.

A variant of this route, the Teevra (fast) Mudrika plies via Sarai Kale Khan, instead of passing through Nizamuddin Dargah and Pragati Maidan to join the Ring Road at Indraprastha Depot. This service has a very high frequency and a lifeline for many commuters. It also is the second longest route operated by Delhi Transport Cooperation.

The Outer Mudrika Service (OMS) is the longest route operated by Delhi Transport Cooperation. It covers the distant parts of Delhi. It has its major stops at Anand Vihar ISBT, Laxmi Nagar, Akshardham, NH 24, Sarai Kale Khan, Ashram, Kalkaji, Okhla, Sangam Vihar, Ambedkar Nagar, Saket, Munirka, R.K. Puram, Dhaula Kuan, Janak Puri, Uttam Nagar, Peeragarhi, Pitampura, Mukarba Chowk, Burari, Wazirabad, Bhajanpura, Yamuna Vihar, Dilshad Garden and back to Anand Vihar. It takes almost 6 hours to complete this circular Trip. The total distance covered is 110 km.

The Yamuna Mudrika Service (YMS) is a circular bus route operated by Delhi Transport Cooperation in East Delhi (Trans Yamuna). The route originates from Mori Gate Terminal and terminates at Mori Gate after completing a round trip. The major stops include Mori Gate, Shashtri Park, Geeta colony, Ganesh Nagar, Mayur Vihar, Trilokpuri, Kalyanpuri, Anand Vihar ISBT, Seemapuri, Nand Nagari, Yamuna Vihar, Bhajanpura and back to Mori Gate.

References 

Transport in Delhi